The Ambassador to the United States is the chief diplomat representing Uruguay in the United States. The Uruguayan legation to the United States was opened June 13, 1900, with most representatives holding the title Envoy Extraordinary and Minister Plenipotentiary (or Minister). It was upgraded to a full embassy on September 3, 1941, with representatives holding the title Ambassador Extraordinary and Plenipotentiary (or Ambassador).

The current embassy building, opened in 2001, is located at 1913 I Street NW, Washington, DC, 20006.

Uruguayan Ministers Plenipotentiary to the United States

Uruguayan Ambassadors to the United States

References

See also

 Politics of Uruguay

 
United States
Uru